Garden City Radio is a public radio station in Kumasi, the capital town of the Ashanti Region of Ghana. The station is owned and run by the state broadcaster - the Ghana Broadcasting Corporation.

References

Radio stations in Ghana
Ashanti Region
Mass media in Kumasi